Infliction is the debut studio album by Northern Irish rock band Scheer. It was released on 28 May 1996 through 4AD record label. The album became a minor alternative hit following the release of the singles "Shéa" and "Wish You Were Dead".

The record features an alternative metal sound with influences from power pop and shoegaze.

Critical reception

AllMusic critic Jonathan Lewis described the record as "a promising but inconsistent debut" and stated: "The problem Scheer encounter is not being able to make the songs different enough or to keep the vocals from sounding exposed." Anya Sacharow of Entertainment Weekly stated that the frontwoman Audrey Gallagher’s "airy, Bjorkian vocals contrast nicely with the mostly metal guitar on Infliction, despite "occasionally lapsing into a monotonous drone". Sacharow also regarded the record as "both hard and pretty — as if you morphed Hole with the Cocteau Twins."

Brad Reno of Trouser Press wrote: "The band kicks up an okay racket and Audrey Gallagher is certainly a strong vocalist, but the material is not desperately memorable." CMJs Aaron Clow thought that the record showcases the band's technical prowess without overshadowing their songwriting. Clow further stated: "The band lives up to its name in a few ways — it's fuzzy and velvety, but watch out for that bed of nails lurking underneath."

Track listing
All tracks are written by Scheer, except where noted.

 "Shéa" — 2:21
 "Howling Boy" — 4:02
 "Wish You Were Dead" — 3:15
 "In Your Hand" — 6:33
 "Demon" — 4:48
 "Babysize" — 6:03
 "Sad Loved Girl" — 4:12
 "Driven" — 3:21
 "Screaming" — 4:02
 "Goodbye" (Gallagher, Calderwood, Fleming) — 5:37

Personnel
Album personnel as adapted from the album liner notes.
Scheer
 Audrey Gallagher — vocals 
 Neal Calderwood — guitar
 Paddy Leyden — guitar
 Peter Fleming — bass guitar
 Joe Bates — drums

Other personnel
 Audrey Riley — cello (10)
 Scheer — production 
 Head — production
 Ted Jensen — mastering
 Mike "Spike" Drake — mixing
 Steve Cook — assistant mixing 
 Timothy O'Donnell — art direction, design
 Vaughan Oliver — art direction, design
 Nicola Schwartz — photography

Chart position
Album

References

External links
 

1996 debut albums
Scheer (band) albums
4AD albums